1570 Brunonia, provisional designation , is a stony asteroid of the Koronis family from the outer regions of the asteroid belt, approximately  in diameter. It was discovered on 9 October 1948, by Belgian astronomer Sylvain Arend at the Royal Observatory of Belgium in Uccle. The S-type asteroid is likely elongated and has a longer-than-average rotation period of more than 48 hours. It was named for Brown University in Rhode Island, United States.

Orbit and classification 

Brunonia is a core member of the Koronis family, a very large outer asteroid family with nearly co-planar ecliptical orbits. It orbits the Sun in the outer main-belt at a distance of 2.7–3.0 AU once every 4 years and 10 months (1,754 days; semi-major axis of 2.85 AU). Its orbit has an eccentricity of 0.06 and an inclination of 2° with respect to the ecliptic. The body's observation arc begins at Uccle in November 1948, one month after its official discovery observation.

Naming 

This minor planet was named for Brown University in Providence, Rhode Island. The 7th oldest university in the United States, Brown was chartered in 1764. The official  was published by the Minor Planet Center in February 1954.

Physical characteristics 

In the SDSS-based taxonomy, Brunonia is a common, stony S-type asteroid, which agrees with the overall spectral type for members of the Koronis family.

Rotation period 

In February 2016, a rotational lightcurve of Brunonia was obtained from photometric observations by the Kepler spacecraft and its K2 mission (Uranus Field). Lightcurve analysis gave a rotation period of at least 48 hours with a brightness amplitude of more than 0.6 magnitude, indicative of an elongated, non-spherical shape.

Diameter and albedo 

According to the surveys carried out by the Japanese Akari satellite and the NEOWISE mission of NASA's Wide-field Infrared Survey Explorer, Brunonia measures between 10.8 and 12.7 kilometers in diameter and its surface has an albedo between 0.166 and 0.209. The Collaborative Asteroid Lightcurve Link assumes an albedo of 0.24 and a diameter of 10.8 kilometers based on an absolute magnitude of 12.0.

References

External links 
 Asteroid Lightcurve Database (LCDB), query form (info )
 Dictionary of Minor Planet Names, Google books
 Discovery Circumstances: Numbered Minor Planets (1)-(5000) – Minor Planet Center
 
 

001570
Discoveries by Sylvain Arend
Named minor planets
Brown University
19481009